Paul Spencer Denman (born July 1957).  English songwriter and bass guitarist.  With Sade Adu, Andrew Hale, and Stuart Matthewman, Denman gained worldwide fame as the bass guitarist of the English band Sade.  He is also a member of the English band Sweetback.

Early life 
Born in Hull, from 1959 to 1979 Denman lived on Greatfield Estate, Kingston upon Hull, East Riding of Yorkshire, England, where Mick Ronson (1946 - 1993) also grew up, as Denman cites in The Mick Ronson Story': "Paul Denman, bass player with Sade, grew up on the same council estate in Hull, albeit a few years later: 'Michael had ambition, very much like myself.  I'm pretty sure if he was here now he'd say" "Yeah, I can't wait to get out of Hull", and neither could I.'

Aged 12, Denman attended a The Rats gig, the rhythm & blues band from Hull comprising Mick Ronson, Mick Woody Woodmansey, and Trevor Boulder who went on to become David Bowie’s backing band The Spiders from Mars.

Showing a strong interest in music Denman’s parents bought him a bass guitar for his 13th birthday in July 1970.   After watching Bowie and The Spiders from Mars audacious performance of Starman on the BBC's Top of the Pops primetime broadcast on Thursday 6 July 1972 that poignantly struck teenage Denman: "Every pop star I talk to from my generation... they all go back to Ziggy."

At 15, he left Greatfield School to start a coppersmith apprenticeship at Hawker/Sidley, Hull, later British Aerospace in Bough, building military aircraft until leaving aged 22. 

After serving his musical apprenticeship on the local Hull circuit, Denman was inspired by the Punk scene and the Sex Pistols and bought a one way train ticket to London in August 1981.  An act that eventually resulted to Denman joining Latin/Funk band Pride, which then evolved into the creation of the band Sade.

Instruments 
Denman is a right-handed bass player and rarely uses guitar picks.

First guitar – a second hand bass £13 from a local charity shop

MusicMan Stingray Bass – natural finish 1978

MusicMan Stingray Bass – natural finish 1977

Fretless Stingray Bass – natural finish 1985

Washburn AB40 acoustic bass

Gretsch hollow body bass

Emanuel Wilfer three quarter upright bass

Schafer three quarter upright acoustic bass

Career

The Posers (1977–1980) 
Founded: Hull, UK

Line up: Paul Anthony Cooke, Paul Spencer Denman, Allan Beedle.

Description: Unsigned prog-rock/new wave/punk band.

Rehearsed at Mayfield Street Studios, Hull.

In 1980 all 3 members relocated full time to London with the intention of furthering the band’s career.

The First Third (1980–1981) 
Founded: London, UK

Line up: Paul Anthony Cooke, Paul Spencer Denman, Allan Beedle.

Description: unsigned prog-rock/new wave/punk band.

Rehearsed at Vaz Studios, Amherst Road, Stoke Newington, North London.

Pride (1981–1983) 
Formally known as Arriva.

Founded: North London, UK

Line up:  Nick Moxsom, Ray Saint John, Stuart Matthewman, Paul Spencer Denman, Paul Anthony Cooke, Barbara Robinson, Sade Adu

Description: A creative Latin / Funk collection of seven musicians with diverse influences.

Notable live performances:

1982 – The band performed on a back of a lorry outside Le Beat Route, 16–17 Greek Street, Soho, London.

September 1982 – performance at The Fridge Club, London.

Thursday 16 September 1982 – performance at Danceteria, New York (Sade Adu had already been in New York as part of the 21 Blitz Kids Invasion whilst designing for the Demob label as part of the Axiom fashion show at The Underground Club on 17 and Broadway on 5/6 May 1981).

February 1983 – filmed at Heaven Nightclub in London for BBC Oxford Roadshow but failed to secure a record deal.

Notable songs: Manhandled, Ecstasy, Pride, The President.

From Pride offshoot bands and other projects were formed including:

PSP - an instrumental jazz inspired live band, using the initials of the names of the trio (Paul Spencer Denman, Stuart Matthewman, Paul Anthony Cooke), all originally from Hull, Yorkshire.

Sade – from the abbreviated name of Helen Folasade Adu.

Sade (December 1982 – present) 
Founded: North London, UK

Line up: Sade Adu, Andrew Hale, Stuart Matthewman, Paul Spencer Denman, Paul Anthony Cooke (final performance U4 Club Vienna, 11 December 1983).

First single: Your Love Is King, on 7 inch vinyl released Saturday 25 February 1984.

Early notable live performances:

Sunday 12 December 1982 – Ronnie Scotts, London, as Sade Adu. Supporting the band Pride.

Sunday 27 February 1983 – Downstairs at Ronnie Scotts, Soho, London, UK as Sade

Thursday 12 May 1983 – Congo Bill / Danceteria Club, 30 W 21ST, New York

Thursday 19 May 1983 – Congo Bill / Danceteria Club, 30 W 21ST, New York

Sunday 19 June 1983 – Downstairs at Ronnie Scotts, Soho, London, UK as Sade

Friday 5 August 1983 – The Yow Club at The Albany, Deptford, South London, UK

Saturday 10 December 1983 – U4 Club, Vienna, Austria

Tuesday 21 February 1984 - Fagins, 65 Oxford Street, Manchester, UK

Monday 27 February 1984 – Heaven Nightclub, Charing Cross, London, UK

Wednesday 2 May 1984 – BBC Paris Studios, Lower Regent Street, London, UK

Saturday 5 May 1984 – BBC Paris Studios, Lower Regent Street, London, UK

Wednesday 27 June 1984 – Kursaal, Ostend, Belgium

Friday 13 July 1984 – Montreux Jazz Festival, Casino de Montreux, Montreux, Switzerland

Monday 30 July 1984 – Royal Festival Hall, Southbank Centre, London, UK

Thursday 7 February 1985 – Festival Delia Canzone Italiana di Sanremo

Wednesday 8 May 1985 – Golden Rose, Casino de Montreux, Montreux, Switzerland

Saturday 13 July 1985 – The band cemented their success at Live Aid at Wembley Stadium performing Why Can’t We Live Together, Is It A Crime, Your Love Is King.

Sweetback (early 1994 – present) 
Founded:  New York / London / Los Angeles

Line up: Stuart Matthewman, Andrew Hale, Paul Spencer Denman with various guest vocalists

First album: Sweetback –  October 1996

Second album: Stage 2 – 22 June 2004

Personal life 
In 1984 Denman contracted Tuberculosis.

Denman has multiple tattoos including a homages to the Sex Pistols on one wrist, and The Clash on the other wrist.

A lifelong supporter of Hull City Football Club “The Tigers”, attending his first match in 1966, Denman has the club crest tattooed over his heart.

Denman currently lives between St Leonards, East Sussex, UK and Los Angeles, USA and is married to Kim Denman, a fashion designer.  

They have two children, visual artist and lecturer Angel-Rose, and musician Joe Dexter the singer and bassist of pop punk band Orange.

Awards and nominations

Discography

References

Living people
1957 births
English funk musicians
English songwriters
Grammy Award winners
Musicians from Kingston upon Hull
Sade (band) members
Sophisti-pop musicians